The Schreder HP-13 is an American high-wing, single seat FAI Open Class glider that was designed by Richard Schreder.

Design and development
The HP-13 (HP stands for high performance) was a developmental milestone aircraft between the HP-11 and the later HP-14. Eight HP-13s were completed.

The HP-13 was later developed into the HP-14 by designing a new fuselage for the wings. The HP-14 was later type certified in the United Kingdom, while the HP-13s were all amateur-built.

Operational history
In April 2011 there were still five HP-13s registered with the Federal Aviation Administration, all in the Experimental - Amateur-built category.

Specifications (HP-13)

See also

References

External links
Photo and information on the sole HP-13H

1960s United States sailplanes
Schreder aircraft